Evelyn J. Lynn is a Republican Party member of the Florida Senate, representing the 7th District since 2003. Her district includes parts of Clay County, Marion County, Putnam County, and Volusia County, Florida. Previously she was a member of the Florida House of Representatives from 1995 through 2002.

Lynn received her Doctorate from the University of Florida, and resides in Ormond Beach, Florida.

Anthrax hoax victim
On November 3, 2008, Lynn's office received an anthrax hoax letter mailed to her post office box address in Ormond Beach. Other similar letters were received at several offices of Rep. Tom Feeney. The envelopes were turned over to the F.B.I. for investigation.

References

External links 

Florida State Legislature - Senator Evelyn J. Lynn
Project Vote Smart - Senator Evelyn J. Lynn (FL) profile
Follow the Money - Evelyn J Lynn
2006 2004 2002 2000 1998 campaign contributions

Republican Party Florida state senators
Republican Party members of the Florida House of Representatives
1930 births
Living people
University of Florida alumni
People from Ormond Beach, Florida
Women state legislators in Florida
People from Astoria, Queens
21st-century American women